Montebrier is a historic plantation house in Brierfield, Alabama.  The -story frame structure was built circa 1853 by S.W. Mahan in a Gothic Revival cottage orné style.  The house is notable for its use of lightly arched porch supports and wide eaves that may show the influence of Andrew Jackson Downing's The Architecture of Country Houses.  It currently remains in the Mahan family as a private residence and was added to the National Register of Historic Places on April 2, 1973.

See also
National Register of Historic Places listings in Bibb County, Alabama

References

Houses on the National Register of Historic Places in Alabama
Gothic Revival architecture in Alabama
Houses completed in 1853
National Register of Historic Places in Bibb County, Alabama
Houses in Bibb County, Alabama
Plantation houses in Alabama